The Bukhan River is a tributary of the Han River that flows through both North and South Korea. It traverses Kangwon province in North Korea and Gangwon and Gyeonggi provinces in South Korea.

The Bukhan River's headwaters lie in North Korea near Geumgangsan; this early portion of the river is often called the Geumgangcheon, or "Geumgang Stream." It crosses the Korean Demilitarized Zone and enters Hwacheon County, flowing south through Chuncheon and then west through Gapyeong.

Notes

References 

Rivers of South Korea
Rivers of North Korea
Rivers of Gyeonggi Province
Rivers of Gangwon Province, South Korea
International rivers of Asia